The Millyard Viper V10 is a one-off motorcycle capable of over  that was built by British engineer Allen Millyard. In early speed tests, it surpassed .https://ultimatemotorcycling.com/2010/04/18/2010_millyard_viper_v10_motorcycle_review/  Millyard Viper V10 | Motorcycle Review

See also
Boss Hoss
Dodge Tomahawk
List of motorcycles by type of engine

References

Custom motorcycles
Individual motorcycles